Woodville North is a north-western suburb of Adelaide 10 km from the Adelaide city centre, in the state of South Australia, Australia and falls under the City of Charles Sturt. The post code for Woodville North is 5012. It is adjacent to Pennington, Athol Park, Woodville Gardens, Mansfield Park, Woodville and Kilkenny. It is bordered to the east by Hanson Road to the west by Carlton Crescent, to the south by Torrens Road and to the north by Hamilton Road. The suburb is residential, apart from an industrial pocket to the northwest.

Facilities

There is no primary school in the area; the nearest are the public Pennington Primary School, the R-2 campus of Pennington Junior Primary School, and Ridley Grove Primary School in the adjacent suburbs of Pennington and Woodville Gardens. Currently, the local zone high school is Woodville High School, in Woodville. There are a few shops and medical practices on Hanson Road, but the closest shopping centre is the Arndale Shopping Centre. The Finsbury Reserve on Park Avenue provides a venue for recreation. The al-Khalil mosque on Torrens Road provides a facility for Islamic worship.

Quan Am Temple, a Vietnamese Buddhist temple, is located in the suburb.

History
The southern pocket of Woodville North, historically called Finsbury Park, used to be a much stronger and active industrial area, with a Government Supply Depot for military purposes operating in the area during the Second World War, which was the basis for the existence of a railway line and station that is now the location of an Islamic mosque .

Woodville North Post Office opened on 14 February 1966. An earlier office of the same name was renamed Kilkenny North in 1964.

Transport
Hanson Road is served by the 253, 254 and the 253X & 254X express bus services. Torrens Road is served by the 230, 232 and 100 services. Park Avenue is served by the 252 service. The Finsbury railway line used to run parallel to Audley Street, mainly to service the industrial activity in the area, but this was removed in 1979 due to the industrial decline. Finsbury railway station occupied the site of the al-Khalil mosque.

Demographics
Woodville North is home to a large immigrant population. The initial settlement of the suburb coincided with a large wave of immigrants from Eastern Europe following the Second World War. Another wave of immigration occurred in the 1980s, when Vietnamese immigrants arrived after the Vietnam War.

References

Suburbs of Adelaide